Ernest Wilson (11 July 1899 – 27 December 1955), commonly known as Tug Wilson, was an English professional footballer who made more than 500 appearances in the Football League playing as an outside left for Brighton & Hove Albion.

Life and career
Wilson was born in Beighton, Yorkshire, and went to school in nearby Swallownest. During the First World War, he worked at Silverwood Colliery, and played football for the colliery's works team, for Beighton Recreation, and for Midland League club Denaby United.

In 1922, after a trial, Wilson signed for Brighton & Hove Albion of the Football League Third Division South. He soon took over from Jimmy Jones at outside left, and was undisputed first choice for the next twelve years. In 1935–36, he finally lost his place, to Bert Stephens, and retired from professional football at the end of the season. He had made 509 Football League appearances, 566 in all first-team competitions, which remain club records.

He remained in Sussex, playing County League football for Vernon Athletic, and went into the bookmaking business with Frank Brett, a former teammate. Wilson died in Hove in 1955 at the age of 56.

References

1899 births
1955 deaths
People from Beighton, Sheffield
Footballers from Derbyshire
English footballers
Association football outside forwards
Silverwood Colliery F.C. players
Beighton Miners Welfare F.C. players
Denaby United F.C. players
Brighton & Hove Albion F.C. players
Midland Football League players
English Football League players